Stealers Wheel were a Scottish folk rock/rock band formed in 1972 in Paisley, Scotland, by former school friends Joe Egan and Gerry Rafferty. Their best-known hit is "Stuck in the Middle with You". The band broke up in 1975 and re-formed briefly in 2008.

Biography
Egan and Rafferty met as teenagers in Paisley, and became the core of Stealers Wheel. They were initially joined by Roger Brown, Rab Noakes and Ian Campbell in 1972. By the time the band was signed to A&M Records later that year, Brown, Noakes and Campbell had been replaced by Paul Pilnick, Tony Williams and Rod Coombes.

The original line-up recorded Stealers Wheel (October 1972), produced by American songwriters and producers Leiber & Stoller, and it was a critical and commercial success, reaching No. 50 in the US Billboard 200 album chart, with their hit single "Stuck in the Middle with You" coming from the album. On 7 November 1972 the band appeared on BBC 2's The Old Grey Whistle Test, performing "I Get By" and "Late Again".

By the time the first album was released, Rafferty had left the band; Luther Grosvenor filled in for him on tour. Tony Williams also left shortly afterwards, and DeLisle Harper joined on bass for the tour.

"Stuck in the Middle with You" reached No. 6 in the US Billboard Hot 100 and No. 8 in the UK Singles Chart in 1973, selling over one million copies worldwide, and was awarded a gold disc. With the album also selling well, Rafferty was persuaded to return. However, Grosvenor, Coombes, Pilnick, and Harper all left the band. The band officially became a duo with various backing musicians on guitar, bass, and drums. Later in 1973, the single "Everyone's Agreed That Everything Will Turn Out Fine" had modest chart success, and in 1974, the single "Star" reached the top 30 of both the UK and US charts. Reviewing the single "Star", David Middleton at PopRockNation wrote:
A catchy shuffle of the Lennonesque variety, 'Star' is 3 minutes of pure shimmering acoustic-guitar pop loveliness and honey-throated vocal harmonies, punctuated with spikes of harmonica, kazoo, woodblock, and bawdy barrelhouse piano.

A second album, Ferguslie Park, was released in 1973, with the duo supported by nine musicians. The album, named after an area of Paisley, just barely reached the US Billboard 200 and was a commercial failure. With increasing tensions between Egan and Rafferty, and with Leiber & Stoller also having business problems, Stealers Wheel went on a year and a half hiatus. By the time their third and final album Right or Wrong was released in 1975, they completely disbanded. Because of disagreements and managerial problems, it was produced by Mentor Williams. In 1978, A&M released the compilation album Gerry Rafferty and Joe Egan — Stuck in the Middle with You (The Best of Stealers Wheel).

Another compilation album, Best of Stealers Wheel, was released in 1990. In 1992, director Quentin Tarantino used the track "Stuck in the Middle with You" on the soundtrack of his debut film Reservoir Dogs. A dance version of "Stuck in the Middle with You" was a UK top 10 hit for Louise in September 2001, with a music video that drew heavily on the original song's appearance in Reservoir Dogs.

All three albums had been unavailable for many years, though in 2004 and 2005 the British independent record label Lemon Recordings, of Cherry Red, re-released them using vinyl sources rather than tapes.

After being contacted by iTunes and K-tel in California, Tony Williams briefly re-formed Stealers Wheel in Blackpool in 2008 with Rod Coombes and Paul Pilnick, together with close friend Tony Mitchell. On 10 November 2008, they started filming a music video for a re-recording of "Stuck in the Middle" on the Fylde coast. They also began writing new songs although they had no plans to tour, and disbanded again.

Gerry Rafferty died on 4 January 2011 of liver failure.

In early 2016, independent record label Intervention Records reissued both Stealers Wheel and Ferguslie Park on 180-gram vinyl.

In 2017, Caroline reissued all three in a mini-boxed set with three BBC bonus tracks on the first album. All were remastered.

Rab Noakes died on 11 November 2022, at the age of 75.

Band members

 Joe Egan – lead and backing vocals, keyboards, rhythm guitar (1972–1975)
 Gerry Rafferty – lead vocals, rhythm guitar, keyboards (1972, 1973–1975; died 2011)
 Paul Pilnick – lead guitar (1972–1973, 2008; died 2021)
 Tony Williams – bass (1972–1973, 2008)
 Rod Coombes – drums (1972–1973, 2008)
 Luther Grosvenor – lead and backing vocals, guitar, lap slide guitar (1973)
 DeLisle Harper – bass (1973)
 Tony Mitchell – lead vocals, rhythm guitar (2008)

Discography

Albums

Singles

References

Further reading

External links
 
 
 

A&M Records artists
British soft rock music groups
British folk rock groups
Musical groups established in 1972
Musical groups disestablished in 1975
1972 establishments in Scotland
1975 disestablishments in Scotland